Peter James Butler (born 27 August 1966) is an English professional football player and coach. As a player, he made more than 450 appearances in the Football League and the Premier League. He then took up coaching, first in England and then in Australia and South-East Asia. He was in charge of the Botswana national team from 2014 until 2017. He is currently the manager of Liberia.

Playing career

Butler played as a midfielder for Huddersfield Town, Cambridge United, Bury, Southend United, West Ham United, Notts County, Grimsby Town, West Bromwich Albion and Halifax Town.

Coaching career

After a spell as caretaker manager of Halifax Town, Butler moved to Australia where he became player-manager of Sorrento FC 2000–2002, where he set up their academy.
He then coached in Singapore with the Singapore Armed Forces Football Club (SAFFC), in Malaysia with Sabah FA, in Indonesia with Persiba Balikpapan, and then back to Malaysia as coach of Kelantan FA. In September 2009, Butler signed a one-year contract as Technical Director and Head Coach of Yangon United FC of Myanmar. In September 2010 Butler became head coach of Thai Premier League team BEC Tero Sasana F.C. He is the holder of a UEFA Pro Licence Qualification. Butler returned to Kelantan to become head coach for the second time in November 2011. He guided the team to the top of the League. However, Butler left stating he could no longer work for Annuar Musa as he was unhappy with the signing of players above his head. Butler was immediately hired by Indonesian Super league side Persiba Balikpapan whom he coached in 2006-08 and led them into the newly formed ISL. He reportedly resigned from Persiba in May 2012, but his resignation is challenged by the club.

Terengganu and T-Team
He officially took over the head coach role at Terengganu FA, from Mat Zan Mat Aris on 1 June 2012, although he had already performed his duties as Terengganu head coach before the date. As head coach Butler reprimanded two players for returning from a night out at 3am on a morning before a match. He actions were mainly backed by the Malaysian public. However the club's management did not support his stance leading to a six-month ban, RM4,000 fine, 15 per cent cut on monthly salary and the termination of his contract.

The penalties received by Butler were considered by the public to be unjust and a means of simply removing him from the club. He was left with 15 months payment on his contract outstanding. The Football Association of Malaysia declared their intent to investigate the situation.

On 18 October, Football Association of Malaysia's disciplinary board completely exonerated Butler of any charges, quashed the suspension imposed on him and publicly condemned the Terengganu FA of bringing shame to the FAM, the TFA were ordered to pay Butler the remaining months on his contract.

Botswana
In February 2014, Butler was appointed manager of the Botswana national team. His first International game was against South Sudan. He won the game three nil with a relatively new young inexperienced squad. He was mostly praised for giving a nineteen years old Ditsile his full debut against Burundi in the AFCON 2015 preliminaries. Botswana went on to knock out Burundi & Guinea Bisau to reach the group stages of the AFCON, with a new team giving debuts to many young players. They lost to a last minute penalty in Tunisia and gave a very strong Senegal team a fright, only losing to a late deflected goal. They have since earn credible results beating Tanzania, Lesotho and drawing against a strong Angolan team in Luanda. Butler has revitalised the Botswana team playing an exciting brand of footballconsequently coming under the radar of some of the bigger teams in African football.

When asked about Botswana in an interview, Butler said that "It's a beautiful country, and the raw passion that Botswanans have for the game is unbelievable. In fact, most of Africa has such an incredibly deep love and enthusiasm for football. You can really feel it when you spend time here."

In February 2017 he was one of a number of managers on the shortlist for the vacant Rwanda national team manager role.

Butler resigned from the Botswana job in June 2017, and within days was appointed as the new head coach of Platinum Stars in South Africa's Premier Soccer League. He departed the position in September 2017.

Liberia

On 21 August 2019, he was appointed as manager of the Liberia national football team.

References

External links
 
 Peter Butler Interview
 Peter Butler: International Man of Football

1966 births
Living people
Association football midfielders
Botswana national football team managers
Bury F.C. players
Cambridge United F.C. players
English Football League players
English football managers
English footballers
Expatriate football managers in Botswana
Expatriate football managers in Malaysia
Expatriate football managers in Thailand
Expatriate soccer managers in Australia
Expatriate soccer managers in South Africa
Expatriate soccer players in Australia
Footballers from Halifax, West Yorkshire
Grimsby Town F.C. players
Halifax Town A.F.C. managers
Halifax Town A.F.C. players
Huddersfield Town A.F.C. players
Liberia national football team managers
Notts County F.C. players
Persiba Balikpapan managers
Platinum Stars F.C. managers
Peter Butler
Premier League players
Sabah F.C. (Malaysia) managers
Sorrento FC players
Southend United F.C. players
West Bromwich Albion F.C. players
West Ham United F.C. players